Yelaur may refer to:

Yelaur, Republic of Tatarstan, a village (selo) in the Republic of Tatarstan, Russia
Yelaur, Ulyanovsk Oblast, a village (selo) in Ulyanovsk Oblast, Russia